Major General Sir William Eyre  KCB (21 October 1805 – 18 September 1859) was an officer in the British Army.

Biography
Eyre was the younger son of Vice-Admiral Sir George Eyre. He was educated at Rugby School; commissioned as an ensign in 1823. He received a company in the 73rd Regiment in 1829. Ten years later he was a major.

He served in Cape Frontier War of 1847 and was promoted to lieutenant-colonel the same year. In the Cape Frontier War of 1851 he defeated the Xhosha at the battle of Quibigui River and the battle of Committees Hill. In 1852 he commanded the right wing in the punitive attack on Moshoeshoe I at Berea in Basutoland.

The same year he was appointed Companion of the Bath, served as aide-de-camp to Queen Victoria, and was promoted to colonel. In 1854 he commanded the 3rd Brigade and later the 3rd Division in Crimean War and was promoted to major-general. In 1855 he accepted appointment as commander of Her Majesty's forces in British North America and was appointed Knight Commander of the Bath and in the following year, 1856, he was decorated by France and Turkey. His health had been broken during the Crimean War and he resigned due to ill health in June 1859. He died on 18 September of that year.

References

1805 births
1859 deaths
British Army major generals
British Army personnel of the Crimean War
73rd Regiment of Foot officers
People educated at Rugby School
Knights Commander of the Order of the Bath